The following lists events from 2014 in Cyprus.

Incumbents 

 President: Nicos Anastasiades
 President of the Parliament: Yiannakis Omirou

Events
Ongoing – Cyprus dispute

May 
12 May – The European Court of Human Rights orders Turkey to pay $124 million in compensation for the 1974 Turkish invasion of Cyprus, which established the internationally unrecognized state of Turkish Republic of Northern Cyprus.
25 May – The 2014 European Parliament election in Cyprus took place, with a total of six members of the European Parliament being elected from Cyprus.

February 
7 – 23 February – Cyprus competed in the 2014 Winter Olympics but won no medals.
11 February – Under pressure to extract natural gas reserves, talks begin over the Cyprus dispute.

Deaths

See also
2013–14 Cypriot First Division
2013–14 Cypriot Second Division
2014–15 Cypriot Cup
2014–15 Cypriot First Division
2014–15 Cypriot Second Division
List of Cypriot football transfers summer 2014
List of Cypriot football transfers winter 2014–15

References

External links

 
Years of the 21st century in Cyprus
Cyprus
Cyprus
2010s in Cyprus
Cyprus